The following list is a partial discography of productions by Pharrell Williams, an American record producer and recording artist from Virginia Beach, Virginia. It includes a list of songs produced, co-produced and remixed by year, artist, album and title. For songs produced only by the Neptunes, a production duo including Williams, see the Neptunes production discography.

This discography notes contributions that were made solely by Pharrell, alongside those that he worked on with the Neptunes and N.E.R.D. and those where these artists have featured appearances, but dismisses those labelled as primary.

International singles and certifications

Full discography

Uncertified 
 2008: Lindsay Lohan – "Playground"
 2011: Jared Evan – "Anywhere" (feat. Game & Pharrell)
 c. 2018: Christina Aguilera – "Search the World"

See also
Pharrell Williams discography
The Neptunes production discography

References

External links
Pharrell Williams at Discogs

 
Discographies of American artists
Hip hop discographies
Production discographies
 
Production discography
Pharrell Williams production discography